The 2005–06 Powergen Anglo-Welsh Cup was the 35th annual rugby union cup competition in England, and the first since it incorporated the four Welsh regional sides to become the Anglo-Welsh Cup. Whereas the competition previously featured teams from the lower levels of the English rugby pyramid, this season it was contested by the 12 teams from the English Premiership and the four Welsh regional sides from the Celtic League.

The competition began with a pool stage, in which each pool consisted of a Welsh region and three English sides, with each team playing the others in the group once. Pool matches were played in September, October and December 2005. The team that finished top of each pool advanced to the semi-finals. The semi-finals were played at the Millennium Stadium in Cardiff on 4 March 2006, and the final was played at Twickenham Stadium in London on 9 April.

London Wasps beat Leicester Tigers 22–17 in their semi-final, while Llanelli Scarlets beat Bath 27–26 in theirs; Wasps then beat the Scarlets 26–10 in the final.

Group stages

Group A

Group B

Group C

Group D

Semi-finals

Final

Notes

See also 
2005–06 English Premiership (rugby union)
2005–06 Celtic League

External links
Powergen Cup on RFU.com

2005–06 rugby union tournaments for clubs
2005–06 English Premiership (rugby union)
2005–06 in Welsh rugby union
2005-06